Sir Henry Yule Braddon  (27 April 1863 – 8 September 1955) was an Australian diplomat, businessman and rugby union player who played for Otago, New South Wales and New Zealand. The position he generally played in was fullback. He is listed as the second All Black in playing order.

Early life
He was born on 27 April 1863 in Calcutta, India to Alice Smith and (Sir) Edward Braddon, later Premier of Tasmania (1894–1899). He was educated in Germany, France and Dulwich College, England, before his family emigrated to Australia in 1878, where he completed his education at Church of England Grammar School, Launceston. On leaving school he worked for the Commercial Bank of Tasmania.

Rugby

He moved to Invercargill in 1882 on transfer with the Bank of Australasia. He played his club rugby for Invercargill Rugby Club but his provincial rugby for Otago as the Invercargill-centred Southland Rugby Football Union did not split away from Otago until 1887. He was selected for the first New Zealand international team, and played in seven of the eight games in Australia in 1884 and is recognised as an Otago's first All Black despite playing in Invercargill at the time of his selection. Braddon later played for New South Wales from 1888 until 1892.

Career
Braddon had a commercial and political career in Australia, working for Dalgetys and representing Australia as Commonwealth Commissioner in the United States. He was appointed a member of the New South Wales Legislative Council in 1917 and was an indirectly-elected member of that body from 1934 to 1940. He was appointed a Knight Commander of the Order of the British Empire in 1920, and died in the Sydney suburb of Woollahra in 1955.

Legacy
Following the death of Henry Roberts in 1949, Braddon was the oldest living All Black.

References

External links 

 
 

1863 births
1955 deaths
British people in colonial India
People educated at Dulwich College
People educated at Launceston Church Grammar School
New Zealand international rugby union players
New Zealand rugby union players
Otago rugby union players
New Zealand people of Cornish descent
Rugby union fullbacks
Australian Knights Commander of the Order of the British Empire
Australian businesspeople
Australian people of Cornish descent
Rugby players and officials awarded knighthoods
Members of the New South Wales Legislative Council